Tikkun olam is a concept in Judaism, which refers to various forms of action intended to repair and improve the world. 

In classical rabbinic literature, the phrase referred to legal enactments intended to preserve the social order. In the Aleinu prayer, it refers to the eradication of idolatry. In Lurianic Kabbalah, the "repair" is mystical: to return the sparks of Divine light to their source by means of ritual performance.

In the modern era, particularly among the post-Haskalah movements, tikkun olam has come to refer to the pursuit of social justice or "the establishment of Godly qualities throughout the world" based on the idea that "Jews bear responsibility not only for their own moral, spiritual, and material welfare, but also for the welfare of society at large".

History

In the Mishnah
The earliest use of the term tikkun olam comes in the phrase mip'nei tikkun ha-olam, "for the sake of repairing the world", which appears in the Mishnah (Gittin 4:2-9) with the meaning of amending the law in order to keep society well-functioning.

A number of legal enactments appear in this passage with mip'nei tikkun ha-olam given as justification:
 One cannot convene a court in another place in order to nullify a get (divorce document). (4:2)
 One must fully specify the names of the husband and wife on a divorce document. (4:2)
 A widow can collect her ketubah even without a formal oath. (4:3)
 Witnesses must sign the divorce document. (4:3)
 Prozbul was instituted. (4:3)
 If a slaveowner set aside his slave as a designated repayment for his debts, the slave is forced to be freed but the responsibility to repay the debt is transferred to the slave. (4:4)
 If a slave's ownership is shared by two masters, and one master frees the slave, the second master is forced to free his share of ownership in the slave (making the slave entirely free) but the slave must repay this value. (4:5)
 Captives are not redeemed for more than their monetary value. (4:6)
 Captives are not aided in their attempts to escape (so that captors do not make the conditions of captivity more restrictive, or else so that captors do not take revenge on other captives). (4:6)
 Torah scrolls, tefillin, and mezuzot are not purchased from non-Jews for more than their value. (4:6)
 Once when a husband made a vow requiring him to divorce his wife, they were then allowed to remarry. (4:7)
 One who sold their field to a non-Jew must purchase and bring the first fruits from that field. (4:9)

More generally, tikkun can mean improvement, establishment, repair, prepare, and more. In this Mishnaic context it generally refers to practical legal measures taken in the present to ameliorate social conditions. In the legal language of the Talmud, however, the verb took on a much more legalistic role, in that a "Takkana" - literally, "Affixation" - was a category of legal enactment made by the Sages.

In Aleinu
A conception of tikkun olam is also found in the Aleinu, a concluding part of most Jewish congregational prayer, which in contrast to the Mishnah's usage, focuses on the end of time. The Aleinu beseeches God:
 Hebrew: ""
 Translation: "to speedily see Your mighty splendor, to cause detestable (idolatry) to be removed from the land, and the (false) gods will be utterly 'cut off', to takein olam – fix/repair/establish a world – under the Almighty's kingdom"
In other words, when all the people of the world abandon false gods and recognize God, the world will have been perfected.

Among modern liberal movements, 
A common but more modern understanding of this phrase is that we share a partnership with God, and are instructed to take the steps towards improving the state of the world and helping others, which simultaneously brings more honor to God's sovereignty. 

Some scholars have argued that the Aleinu prayer is actually not a valid source for the concept of tikkun olam, claiming that the original prayer used a homonym "l'takhen" (spelled differently) meaning "to establish" (rather than "to fix" or "to repair"); this wording is still used by Yemenite Jews. However, among European Jews, Aleinu has used the word "to fix" since at least the first recorded texts in the 11th-12th centuries. Thus, Aleinu's influence on the concept of tikkun olam can date to at least this time.

Maimonides
Over the course of Jewish intellectual history, tikkun olam has at times referred to eschatological concerns, as in Aleinu, and at times to practical concerns, as in the Mishnah, but in either context, it refers to some kind of social change or process that is for the betterment of society or humanity or the world. Whether that happens primarily within Jewish society or primarily in relation to the nations of the world, whether that happens primarily through acts of justice and kindness, or equally through ritual observance, whether primarily through internal work of an individual or through external deeds, is something that changes from one source to the next. For example, Talmudic scholar and eminent philosopher of the Middle Ages, Maimonides saw tikkun olam as fully inclusive of all these dimensions when he wrote "Through wisdom, which is [represented by] Torah, and the elevation of character, which is [represented by] acts of kindness, and observing the Torah’s commandments, which are [represented by] the sacrifices, one continuously brings tikkun olam improvement of the world, and the ordering of reality." Yet he also saw justice as a fundamental component, as for example when he wrote, "Every judge who judges truth unto its [deepest] truth, even for one hour, it’s as if he fixed the whole world entirely / tikein et kol ha’olam kulo and caused the Shekhinah to rest upon Israel."

Lurianic Kabbalah
Lurianic Kabbalah dwells on the role of prayer and ritual in tikkun of the upper worlds. According to this vision of the world, God contracted part of God's infinite light (Ohr Ein Sof)—concealing Himself—to create the world. The vessels (kelim) of the first universe—Olam HaTohu, i.e., the "world of chaos"—shattered (Shevirat HaKelim) and their shards became sparks of light (neẓuẓot) trapped within the next universe—Olam HaTikun, i.e., "the world of rectification." Prayer, especially contemplation of various aspects of the divinity (sephirot), releases these sparks of God's light and allows them to reunite with God's essence. The “rectification” is two-fold: the gathering of light and of souls, to be achieved by human beings through the contemplative performance of religious acts. The goal of such repair, which can only be effected by humans, is to separate what is holy from the created world, thus depriving the physical world of its very existence, destroying the material universe. This restores all things to a world before disaster within the Godhead.

According to Moshe Chaim Luzzatto, in his book Derech Hashem, the physical world is connected to spiritual realms above that influence the physical world, and furthermore, Jews have the ability, through physical deeds and free will, to direct and control these spiritual forces. God's desire in creation was that God's creations ultimately will recognize God's unity and overcome evil; this will constitute the perfection (tikkun) of creation. While the Jews have the Torah now and are aware of God's unity, some believe that when all of humanity recognizes this fact, the rectification will be complete. In recent years Jewish thinkers and activists have used Lurianic Kabbalah to elevate the full range of ethical and ritual mitzvot into acts of tikkun olam. The belief that not only does prayer lift up divine sparks, but so do all of the mitzvot, including those traditionally understood as ethical, was already a part of Kabbalah, but the contemporary emphasis serves the purpose of finding a mystical depth and spiritual energy in ethical mitzvot. The application of the Lurianic vision to improving the world can be seen in Jewish blogs, High Holiday sermons and on-line Jewish learning resource centers.

The association between the Lurianic conception of tikkun and ethical action assigns an ultimate significance to even small acts of kindness and small improvements of social policy. However, this association can be a double-edged sword and has begun to trigger critique even within the social justice community. On one hand, seeing each action as raising a divine spark can motivate people to action by giving them hope that their actions will have long-term value. On the other hand, if this is done in a manner that separates the concept of tikkun olam from its other meanings as found in rabbinic literature and the Aleinu prayer, the risk of privileging actions that have no real significance and represent personal agendas is introduced.

The application of Lurianic Kabbalah to ethical mitzvot and social action is particularly striking because Lurianic Kabbalah saw itself as repairing dimensions within the spiritual, the mystical worlds, rather than this world and its social relations. Author Lawrence Fine points to two features of Lurianic Kabbalah that have made it adaptable to ethical mitzvot and social action. First, he points out that a generation recovering from the tragedy of the Holocaust resonates with the imagery of shattered vessels. Second, both Lurianic Kabbalah and ethical understandings of tikkun olam emphasize the role of human responsibility and action.

Modern developments
The original context of the Aleinu prayer, in the Rosh Hashanah liturgy, is accompanied by the hope that "all [people/creatures] will form a single union to do Your will with a whole heart". In many contexts this is interpreted to be a call to universalism and justice for all mankind – sentiments which are common throughout Jewish liturgy. For example, in the American Conservative movement's prayer book, Siddur Sim Shalom, "A Prayer for Our Country" elaborates on this passage: "May citizens of all races and creeds forge a common bond in true harmony to banish all hatred and bigotry" and "uniting all people in peace and freedom and helping them to fulfill the vision of your prophet: 'Nation shall not lift up sword against nation, neither shall they experience war anymore. Both lines express wholeheartedly the idea of universal equality, freedom, and peace for all.

In the liberal movements of Judaism, most especially in the United States, this sentiment is especially embedded in the idea of acting compassionately for all people, as for example in the 1975 New Union prayer book, used by the movement for Reform Judaism Gates of Prayer, which includes the text "You [Lord] have taught us to uphold the falling, to heal the sick, to free the captive, to comfort all who suffer pain". These aspects of Judaism already have a traditional name however, gemilut chasadim, and some have criticized the tendency to emphasize social action as a kind of disregard for other aspects of Judaism traditionally connected to tikkun olam, like learning, prayer, repentance, and ritual commandments.

Perhaps the first Jewish thinker to use the phrase "tikkun olam" in the modern sense of "fixing the world" by building a just society was Rabbi Abraham Isaac Kook (1865-1935). According to Jewish scholar Lawrence Fine, the first use of the phrase tikkun olam in modern Jewish history in the United States was by Brandeis-Bardin Camp Institute founder Shlomo Bardin in the 1950s. Bardin interpreted the Aleinu prayer, specifically the expression le-taken olam be-malchut shaddai (typically translated as when the world shall be perfected under the reign of the almighty), as a responsibility for Jewish people to work towards a better world. However, while Bardin was a significant popularizer of the term, one also finds it being used in similar manner in the late 1930s and early 1940s by Alexander Dushkin and Mordecai Kaplan. As left-leaning progressive Jewish organizations started entering the mainstream in the 1970s and 1980s, the phrase tikkun olam began to gain more traction. The phrase has since been adopted by a variety of Jewish organizations, to mean anything from direct service to general philanthropy. It was presented to a wide international audience—itself an indication of how widely tikkun olam had now permeated American Jewish life—when Mordecai Waxman used the phrase in a speech during Pope John Paul II's visit to the United States in September 1987.

Performance of mitzvot 
Classical Jewish texts teach that performing of ritual mitzvot (good deeds, commandments, connections, or religious obligations) is a means of tikkun olam, helping to perfect the world, and that the performance of more mitzvot will hasten the coming of the Messiah and the Messianic Age. This belief dates back at least to the early Talmudic period. According to Rabbi Yochanan, quoting Rabbi Shim'on bar Yochai, the Jewish people will be redeemed when every Jew observes Shabbat twice in all its details. Some explain that this will occur because Shabbat rest (which is considered a foretaste of the Messianic Age) energizes Jews to work harder to bring the Messianic Age nearer during the six working days of the week. It is expected that in the messianic era there will be no injustice or exploitation, a state comparable with tikkun olam.

Ethical behavior
In Jewish thought, ethical mitzvot as well as ritual mitzvot are important to the process of tikkun olam. Maimonides writes that tikkun olam requires efforts in all three of the great "pillars" of Judaism: Torah study, acts of kindness, and the ritual commandments. Some Jews believe that performing mitzvot will create a model society among the Jewish people, which will in turn influence the rest of the world. By perfecting themselves, their local Jewish community or the state of Israel, the Jews set an example for the rest of the world. The theme is frequently repeated in sermons and writings across the Jewish spectrum: Reconstructionist, Reform, Conservative, and Orthodox. 

Also, the mitzvot often have practical worldly/social effects (in contrast to mystical effects as held by Lurianic Kabbalah).

Tzedakah
Tzedakah is a central theme in Judaism and serves as one of the 613 commandments. Tzedakah is used in common parlance as charitable giving. Tzedek, the root of tzedakah, means justice or righteousness. Acts of tzedakah are used to generate a more just world. Therefore, tzedakah is a means through which to perform tikkun olam.

Philanthropy is an effective tool in performing tikkun olam as it supports organizations that perform direct service. There are many different philanthropic organizations devoted to repairing the world. The United Jewish Federations of North America, one of the top ten charities in the world, counts tikkun olam as one of the three main principles under which it operates. Similarly, the American Jewish World Service supports grassroots organizations creating change in Africa, Asia, and the Americas.

The intersection between tzedakah, philanthropy, and tikkun olam is captured by Yehudah Mirsky in his article "Tikkun Olam: Basic Questions and Policy Directions". Mirsky writes:

Building a model society
By performing the mitzvot, it is believed that the Jewish people will become a model society. This idea sometimes is attributed to Biblical verses that describe the Jews as "a kingdom of priests and a holy nation" and "a light of the nations" or "a light to the nations" ( and ). The philosophies of Rabbi Samson Raphael Hirsch, Rabbi Abraham Isaac Kook, and Rabbi Yehuda Ashlag are prominent in this field, the former rationally and in terms of a kehilla (community) of Jews in galut (the diaspora) influencing their non-Jewish neighbors, and the latter mystically and in Zionist terms of a Jewish state influencing the other nations of the world. Some other Orthodox rabbis, many but not all of them Modern Orthodox, follow a philosophy similar to Hirsch's, including Joseph H. Hertz, Isidore Epstein, and Eliezer Berkovits. The philosophy of Religious Zionism follows Kook in his philosophy.

In Modern Orthodox philosophy (which often is intertwined with Religious Zionism, especially in America), it is commonly believed that mitzvot have practical this-worldly sociological and educational effects on those who perform them, and in this manner, the mitzvot will perfect the Jews and the world.

According to the rationalist philosophy of Hirsch and others, the social and ethical mitzvot have nearly self-explanatory purposes, while ritual mitzvot may serve functions such as educating people or developing relationships between people and God. As examples, prayer either inculcates a relationship between people and God or strengthens beliefs and faith of the one who prays, and keeping kosher or wearing tzitzit serve as educational symbols of moral and religious values. Thus, the ultimate goal of mitzvot is for moral and religious values and deeds to permeate the Jewish people and ultimately the entire world, but the ritual mitzvot nevertheless play a vital role in this model of tikkun olam, strengthening what is accomplished by the ethical.

Hirsch's Horeb is an especially important source, as his exposition of his philosophy of the mitzvot. He classifies the mitzvot into six categories:
 (1) toroth (philosophical doctrines);
 The ethical mitzvot fall under (2) mishpatim and (3) chukim (commandments of justice towards (living) people and the natural world (including the human body itself) respectively) and (4) mitzvot (commandments of love);
 The ritual mitzvot under (5) edoth (educational symbolic commandments) and (6) avodah (commandments of direct service to God).

Aside from the fact that by perfecting themselves, the Jews set an example for the rest of the world, there is thus the additional distinction that mitzvot have practical, worldly effects—for example, charity benefits the poor materially, constituting tikkun olam by its improvement of the world physically or socially, in contrast to the mystical effects of mitzvot as held by Lurianic Kabbalah.

Improving the world

For some Jews, the phrase tikkun olam means that Jews are not only responsible for creating a model society among themselves but also are responsible for the welfare of the society at large. This responsibility may be understood in religious, social or political terms and there are many different opinions about how religion, society, and politics interact.

Jane Kanarek, a Conservative rabbi, argues that discussions of tikkun olam in the Mishnah and Talmud point to the importance of creating systemic change through law.  She concludes that contemporary tikkun olam should also focus on systemic and structural changes to society.

While many non-Orthodox Jews have argued that tikkun olam requires socially liberal politics, some have argued for the validity of a conservative political approach to tikkun olam.  Michael Spiro, a Reconstructionist Jew, draws on a conservative tradition that emphasizes free markets precisely because they believed that was the path to the greatest public good. In addition, conservatives have always emphasized the importance of private efforts of gemilut chasadim (benevolence) and tzedakah (charity or philanthropy), and Spiro argues that  tikkun olam should be carried out through such private efforts rather than through government.

Jewish youth organizations 
Tikkun olam is used to refer to Jewish obligations to engage in social action in the Reform and Conservative movements as well. For example, in USY, the Conservative youth movement, the position in charge of social action on chapter and regional boards is called the SA/TO (social action/tikkun olam) officer. Furthermore, USY has the Abraham Joshua Heschel Honor Society. A requirement of acceptance to the honor society is to perform one act of community service a month. In NFTY, the American branch of Netzer Olami, the Reform youth movement, the position in charge of social action on chapter and regional boards is called the social action vice president (SAVP).

In addition, other youth organizations have also grown to include tikkun olam has part of its foundation. BBYO has community service/social action commitments in both of its divisions, AZA and BBG. BBG includes two different programming areas specific to tikkun olam—one for community service, and another for social action. AZA includes a combined community service/social action programming area. In addition, both divisions include "pledge principles," principles by which to guide them. For BBG girls the "menorah pledge principles" include citizenship, philanthropy, and community service. For AZA members, the "7 cardinal principles" include charity.

Jewish fundamentalism
Elon University professor Geoffrey Claussen has asserted that concepts of tikkun olam have inspired Jewish fundamentalists such as Meir Kahane and Yitzchak Ginsburgh. According to Claussen, "while visions of tikkun olam may reflect humility, thoughtfulness, and justice, they are often marked by arrogance, overzealousness, and injustice."

See also
 Eschatology
 Ethics
 Jewish ethics
 Moral idealism

References

Further reading
 
 
 
 Tikkun Olam: Judaism, Humanism & Transcendence, ed. David Birnbaum and Martin S. Cohen (New York: New Paradigm Matrix Publishing, 2015).
"The Rise Of Tikkun Olam Paganism", By Steven Plaut, Arutz Sheva

Jewish philosophy
Jewish theology
Kabbalah